Vincenzo Lauro (1523–1592) was an Italian papal diplomat, bishop of Mondovì, and Cardinal from 1583.

He was born at Tropea. His career was forwarded by Cardinal Pier Paolo Parisio and Cardinal Nicola Gaddi. He became a diplomat while acting for Cardinal François de Tournon in 1552. He became bishop of Mondovì in 1566 and in the same year was sent on a papal mission to Mary, Queen of Scots.

Notes

External links

1523 births
1592 deaths
Bishops in Piedmont
Bishops of Mondovì
16th-century Italian cardinals
Diplomats of the Holy See
Italian expatriates in Scotland
People from the Province of Vibo Valentia